Jess is a rule engine for the Java platform that was developed by Ernest Friedman-Hill of Sandia National Labs. It is a superset of the CLIPS programming language. It was first written in late 1995. The language provides rule-based programming for the automation of an expert system, and is frequently termed as an expert system shell. In recent years, intelligent agent systems have also developed, which depend on a similar capability.

Rather than a procedural paradigm, where a single program has a loop that is activated only one time, the declarative paradigm used by Jess continuously applies a collection of rules to a collection of facts by a process called pattern matching. Rules can modify the collection of facts, or they can execute any Java code. It uses the Rete algorithm to execute rules.

License
While CLIPS is licensed as open source, Jess is not open source.
JESS is free for educational and government use but a license is required to use JESS for commercial systems.

Code examples
Code examples:
; is a comment

(bind ?x 100)

; x = 100

(deffunction max (?a ?b)
             (if (> ?a ?b) then ?a else ?b))

(deffacts myroom
          (furniture chair)
          (furniture table)
          (furniture bed)
          )

(deftemplate car
             (slot color)
             (slot mileage)
             (slot value)
             )

(assert (car (color red) (mileage 10000) (value 400)))
Sample code:
(clear)
(deftemplate blood-donor (slot name) (slot type))
(deffacts blood-bank ; put names & their types into [[working memory]]
          (blood-donor (name "Alice")(type "A"))
          (blood-donor (name "Agatha")(type "A"))
          (blood-donor (name "Bob")(type "B"))
          (blood-donor (name "Barbara")(type "B"))
          (blood-donor (name "Jess")(type "AB"))
          (blood-donor (name "Karen")(type "AB"))
          (blood-donor (name "Onan")(type "O"))
          (blood-donor (name "Osbert")(type "O"))
          )
(defrule can-give-to-same-type-but-not-self ; handles A > A, B > B, O > O, AB > AB, but not N1 > N1
         (blood-donor (name ?name)(type ?type))
         (blood-donor (name ?name2)(type ?type2 &:(eq ?type ?type2) &: (neq ?name ?name2) ))
         =>
         (printout t ?name " can give blood to " ?name2 crlf)
         )
(defrule O-gives-to-others-but-not-itself ; O to O cover in above rule
         (blood-donor (name ?name)(type ?type &:(eq ?type "O")))
         (blood-donor (name ?name2)(type ?type2 &: (neq ?type ?type2) &: (neq ?name ?name2) ))
         =>
         (printout t ?name " can give blood to " ?name2 crlf)
         )
(defrule A-or-B-gives-to-AB ; case O gives to AB and AB gives to AB already dealt with
         (blood-donor (name ?name)(type ?type &:(or (eq ?type "A") (eq ?type "B" ))))
         (blood-donor (name ?name2)(type ?type2 &: (eq ?type2 "AB") &: (neq ?name ?name2) ))
         =>
         (printout t ?name " can give blood to " ?name2 crlf)
         )
;(watch all)
(reset)
(run)

See also
 JSR-94
 Decision Model and Notation

Related systems

 CLIPS: public domain software tool for building expert systems.
 ILOG rules: a business rule management system.
 JBoss Drools: a business rule management system (BRMS).
 Prolog: a general purpose logic programming language.
 OpenL Tablets: business centric rules and BRMS.
 DTRules: a decision table based, open-sourced rule engine for Java.

References

Additional sources

External links
 Official Website

Expert systems
Rule engines
Knowledge representation languages
Java APIs
Sandia National Laboratories